The Somali hedgehog (Atelerix sclateri) is a species of mammal in the family Erinaceidae. It is endemic to Somalia and Somaliland. The Somali hedgehog is nocturnal.

Distribution
The Somali hedgehog is native to areas on the outer borders of Somalia and Somaliland.

Habitat
It is a savanna species that is believed to live mostly in grasslands and other open habitats.

Threats
There is little known about this species, but from what is known there are believed to be no current threats to the hedgehog's habitat.

References

 World Conservation Monitoring Centre 1996.  Atelerix sclateri.   2006 IUCN Red List of Threatened Species.   Downloaded on 30 July 2007.
 Hutterer, R. 2008. Atelerix sclateri. In: IUCN 2011. IUCN Red List of Threatened Species. Version 2011.2. <www.iucnredlist.org>. Downloaded on 4 May 2012.

Endemic fauna of Somalia
Somali hedgehog
Mammals of Somalia
Somali hedgehog
Taxonomy articles created by Polbot